Utrechtse Heuvelrug National Park is a national park in the Dutch province of Utrecht. It covers the southern part of the Utrecht Hill Ridge. When it was founded in 2003, the park covered  of heathlands, shifting sands, forests, grass lands and floodplains. The most striking landscape feature is the glacial ridge after which the park is named.

Landscape and history 
The landscape of the park dates from the next-to-last ice age, Saalien. Afterwards the land was reshaped by the drifting sands, the rivers and the effects of human occupation. Intensive land use, reforestation and the building of country estates transformed the appearance of the Utrechtse Heuvelrug over the centuries. The history of the region is reflected in the wide variety of soil types, relief and land use.

Flora and fauna 
The Utrechtse Heuvelrug is the second largest forest area in the Netherlands. In the forest some relics from the original post-glacial forests can be found, including oak and beech. In the park several marten species can be found, such as the European badger (Meles meles) and the European pine marten (Martes martes). There are more than 100 bird species living in the park, among which the black woodpecker, the raven and the bluethroat. In the marshy region near Amerongen castle the little bittern is a rare species, as well as rare plants like sundew and marsh gentian. In addition, several amphibian, reptile, bat, butterflies and dragonflies species are living in the region.

Management 
Responsible for the management of the park are Staatsbosbeheer, the private provincial nature conservation organization Het Utrechts Landschap and the national private organization for nature management Natuurmonumenten, together with many private land owners. Management plans are made together with these owners, the authorities and stakeholders.

One of the main aims of management is countering the ecological fragmentation, as a result of the many roads in the area. To do so, several ecoducts and other fauna passageways are constructed or planned to connect the nature reserves. In addition to removing fencing and creating green corridors, this should enable the migration of flora and fauna, including large animals such as deer.

Recreation
In the national park are many trails for walking, biking and horse riding, as well as restaurants, hotels and camp sites. Interesting places to visit are many castles, historic villages and cities, country houses, tobacco barns and sheepfolds.

References

External links 

Official website

Protected areas established in 2003
2003 establishments in the Netherlands
Forests of the Netherlands
National parks of the Netherlands
Geography of Utrecht (province)
Tourist attractions in Utrecht (province)
Leusden
Rhenen
Utrechtse Heuvelrug
Veenendaal
Woudenberg
Zeist